FUnit is a unit testing framework for Fortran, in the style of other xUnit testing frameworks.

External links

 at RubyForge
Documentation

Extreme programming
Unit testing frameworks